Dunvegan-Central Peace was a provincial electoral district in Alberta, Canada mandated to return a single member to the Legislative Assembly of Alberta using the first-past-the-post method of voting from 2004 to 2012.

Following the Alberta electoral boundary re-distribution of 2004, Dunvegan was the only division with a population of less than 75% the provincial average, with its recorded population of 24,202. It  is thus formally designated as a special consideration division, as opposed to a standard rural division. Because of its isolation, the constituency meets criteria in the Albertan election laws allowing for this discrepancy. Until 2004, the district of Dunvegan, with almost the same boundaries.

The constituency laid on the border with British Columbia. Major towns include Fairview, Falher, Grimshaw and Spirit River. The riding contained a large agricultural industry based on cattle farming, the border closure to live beef hurt the riding.

Peace River borders to the north and east. Lesser Slave Lake borders to the east. Grande Prairie Smoky and Grande Prairie Wapiti border to the south. Peace River South borders to the west in British Columbia

Dunvegan-Central Peace history

Boundary history

Electoral history
The electoral district of Dunvegan-Central peace was created from Dunvegan in the 2003 electoral boundary re-distribution. The first election in the new district was hotly contested between Progressive Conservative Hector Goudreau and Dale Lueken from the Alberta Alliance.

Lueken and Goudreau would face each other again in the 2008 general election. Goudreau easily held his seat and gained popular vote against Leuken. The construction of a nuclear power plant became a significant issue in that race.

The Dunvegan-Central Peace electoral district was dissolved following the 2010 electoral boundary re-distribution to form Dunvegan-Central Peace-Notley.

General Election results

2004 general election

2008 general election

Senate Nominations

2004 Senate nominee election district results

Voters had the option of selecting 4 Candidates on the Ballot

Alberta Student Vote 2004

On November 19, 2004, a Student Vote was conducted at participating Alberta schools to parallel the 2004 Alberta general election results. The vote was designed to educate students and simulate the electoral process for persons who have not yet reached the legal majority. The vote was conducted in 80 of the 83 provincial electoral districts with students voting for actual election candidates. Schools with a large student body that reside in another electoral district had the option to vote for candidates outside of the electoral district then where they were physically located.

See also
List of Alberta provincial electoral districts

References

External links 
Electoral Divisions Act 2003
Demographics for Dunvegan-Central Peace
Riding Map for Dunvegan-Central Peace
Website of the Legislative Assembly of Alberta
Discover the Peace Country - Dunvegan

Former provincial electoral districts of Alberta